Hasida Hebbuli is a 1983 Indian Kannada film,  directed by  S. A. Chandrasekhar and produced by Venkataram. The film stars Ambareesh, Ambika, Vajramuni and Tiger Prabhakar in the lead roles. The film has musical score by Chellapilla Satyam. The film was a remake of director's own Tamil film Nenjile Thunivirunthal.

Cast

Ambareesh
Ambika
Vajramuni
Tiger Prabhakar
Dinesh
Shakti Prasad
 M. S. Umesh
Ravichandra
Shashikala
Vijayaranjini
B. Jayashree
Baby Rekha
Master Sanjay
Arikesari
Vijayakashi

Soundtrack
"Savinenappu Yemanathe" - S. P. Balasubrahmanyam,  S. Janaki
"Praaya Matherithe" - S. P. Balasubrahmanyam,  S. Janaki
"Yello Aathodhuddoru" - S. P. Balasubrahmanyam
"Ee Rathraadi Namakkaagi" - S. Janaki, Surendran

References

1983 films
1980s Kannada-language films
Kannada remakes of Tamil films
Films scored by Satyam (composer)